Modou Bamba Gaye is a Gambian politician who was the National Assembly Member for Lower Saloum, representing the National Reconciliation Party (NRP), from a 2015 by-election to the 2017 parliamentary election.

Political career 
Gaye was elected at a 2015 by-election for the seat of Lower Saloum, following the dismissal of incumbent NAM Pa Malick Ceesay from the ruling Alliance for Patriotic Reorientation and Construction (APRC). Gaye defeated APRC candidate Kebba Touray in the election, winning 2764 votes to Touray's 1618 votes. Speaking in the National Assembly in January 2017, during the constitutional crisis and Yahya Jammeh's refusal to step down, Gaye called for a peaceful transition of power and said, "The people who voted us in are the same people who voted for Jammeh before and are the same people who voted Adama Barrow."

References 

Living people
Gambian politicians
Members of the National Assembly of the Gambia
National Reconciliation Party politicians
Year of birth missing (living people)